The 1978 St. Louis Cardinals  season was the team's 97th season in St. Louis, Missouri and its 87th season in the National League. The Cardinals went 69-93 during the season and finished fifth in the National League East, 21 games behind the Philadelphia Phillies.

Offseason 
 October 25, 1977: The Cardinals traded a player to be named later to the San Francisco Giants for Frank Riccelli. The Cardinals completed the deal by sending Jim Dwyer to the Giants on June 15, 1978.
 December 8, 1977: Dave Rader and Héctor Cruz were traded by the Cardinals to the Chicago Cubs for Jerry Morales, Steve Swisher, and cash.
 February 2, 1978: Ken Rudolph was signed as a free agent by the Cardinals.
 March 15, 1978: Rick Bosetti was traded by the Cardinals to the Toronto Blue Jays for Tom Bruno and cash.

Regular season 
In late April, the Cardinals fired manager Vern Rapp, who had started at 7-11. He was briefly replaced by coach Jack Krol for two games (1-1) before giving the job on a permanent basis to their former MVP third-baseman Ken Boyer, who went 61-81 the rest of the way.

On June 16, Tom Seaver of the Cincinnati Reds made history by pitching a no-hitter against the Cardinals. It would be the only no-hitter of his career.

First baseman Keith Hernandez won a Gold Glove.

Season standings

Record vs. opponents

Opening Day starters 
Lou Brock
John Denny
Keith Hernandez
Jerry Morales
Ken Reitz
Tony Scott
Ted Simmons
Garry Templeton
Mike Tyson

Notable transactions 
 May 26, 1978: Eric Rasmussen was traded by the Cardinals to the San Diego Padres for George Hendrick.
 June 8, 1978: Frank Riccelli was traded by the Cardinals to the Houston Astros for Bob Coluccio.
 July 18, 1978: John Tamargo was traded by the Cardinals to the San Francisco Giants for a player to be named later. The Giants completed the deal by sending Rob Dressler to the Cardinals on July 24.

Roster

Player stats

Batting

Starters by position 
Note: Pos = Position; G = Games played; AB = At bats; H = Hits; Avg. = Batting average; HR = Home runs; RBI = Runs batted in

Other batters 
Note: G = Games played; AB = At bats; H = Hits; Avg. = Batting average; HR = Home runs; RBI = Runs batted in

Pitching

Starting pitchers 
Note: G = Games pitched; IP = Innings pitched; W = Wins; L = Losses; ERA = Earned run average; SO = Strikeouts

Other pitchers 
Note: G = Games pitched; IP = Innings pitched; W = Wins; L = Losses; ERA = Earned run average; SO = Strikeouts

Relief pitchers 
Note: G = Games pitched; W = Wins; L = Losses; SV = Saves; ERA = Earned run average; SO = Strikeouts

Awards and records

League leaders 
 Garry Templeton, National League leader, Triples

Farm system

References

External links
1978 St. Louis Cardinals at Baseball Reference
1978 St. Louis Cardinals team page at www.baseball-almanac.com

St. Louis Cardinals seasons
Saint Louis Cardinals season
St Louis